Wingless-type MMTV integration site family, member 2, also known as WNT2, is a human gene.

This gene is a member of the WNT gene family. The WNT gene family consists of structurally related genes that encode secreted signaling proteins involved in the Wnt signaling pathway. These proteins have been implicated in oncogenesis and in several developmental processes, including regulation of cell fate and patterning during embryogenesis. Alternatively spliced transcript variants have been identified for this gene.

References

Further reading